The men's freestyle welterweight was a freestyle wrestling event held as part of the Wrestling at the 1924 Summer Olympics programme. It was the second appearance of the event. Welterweight was the middle category, including wrestlers weighing from 66 to 72 kilograms.

Results
Source: Official results; Wudarski

Gold medal round

Silver medal round

Bronze medal round

References

Wrestling at the 1924 Summer Olympics